John Ume (born 19 August 1996) is a Papua New Guinean amateur boxer. He represented Papua New Guinea at the 2020 Summer Olympics.

He won a gold medal at the 2019 Pacific Games. He also competed at the 2018 Commonwealth Games.

Career
Ume hails from Kairuku, Papua New Guinea, but grew up in Hohola, a suburb of the capital city of Port Moresby. After seeing video of Mike Tyson, he took up boxing as a form of self-defense in response to being bullied, initially joining the Soiki Boxing Club in 2012. The following year, Ume defeated national team captain Tom Boga by split decision at the National Capital District (NCD) trials, but Boga was still selected to represent the district at the national championships due to his experience. After moving to the Wantoks Boxing Club, the nineteen-year-old beat Boga once again at the 2015 NCD trials.

Ume was first called up to the national team in 2016 for a dual match against Fiji. Although the PNG squad lost 4–2 overall, he won his matchup against Jone Koroilagilagi convincingly for his first international victory. Ume won a bronze medal at the 2017 Oceanian Championships in Australia, then a silver medal at the 2017 Pacific Mini Games in Vanuatu, where he lost to Roy Sere of the host nation in the finals. He also suffered a quick exit at the 2018 Commonwealth Games, losing in his first match.

Ume was one of two Papua new Guinean boxers to win a gold medal at the 2019 Pacific Games in Samoa, defeating Fijian opponent Jone Davule in the final. At the 2020 Asia & Oceania Olympic Qualification Tournament, he won his first bout against Nassim Saddiq of Saudi Arabia where he forced a referee stoppage in the final round. However, Ume faced the tournament's third seed, Baatarsükhiin Chinzorig, in his next fight and lost by unanimous decision. In light of the COVID-19 pandemic, the qualification process was restructured and the final World Olympic Qualification Tournament was cancelled. Ume was subsequently awarded a spot at the delayed 2020 Summer Olympics through a tripartite invitation from the International Olympic Committee.

References

External links

 Amateur boxing record at BoxRec

Living people
1996 births
Papua New Guinean male boxers
Light-welterweight boxers
Commonwealth Games competitors for Papua New Guinea
Boxers at the 2018 Commonwealth Games
Olympic boxers of Papua New Guinea
Boxers at the 2020 Summer Olympics
People from Central Province (Papua New Guinea)
People from the National Capital District (Papua New Guinea)